The East Asian Games included competitions in the sport of basketball at all six of the Games held between 1993 and 2013. The Chinese Taipei national basketball team won the gold medal at three of the Games.

Men's tournaments

Women's tournaments

Medal table

See also
Basketball at the Asian Games
FIBA Asia Championship

External links
(Chinese)

East Asian Games Basketball Schedule

Sports at the East Asian Games
East Asian Games